Chakuriki Gym is a kickboxing gym and headquarters of the International Chakuriki Association located in Amsterdam, the Netherlands. It is also known as Dojo Chakuriki, Pancration Chakuriki, and Chakuriki Amsterdam. Founded in 1972, it is one of the oldest and well-established kickboxing gyms in the Netherlands. It has produced many top-level kickboxers and including K-1 world champions such as Peter Aerts, Branko Cikatić and Badr Hari. It also provides training in wrestling, as well as instruction in knockdown karate, judo, boxing and mixed martial arts.

History
Chakuriki Gym was founded in 1972 by Thom Harinck, who originally began teaching his own style named "Chakuriki". The word Chakuriki is derived from the word "shakuriki” (借力 - "borrowing power"), referring the original style being a mixture of techniques from boxing, Kyokushin karate, judo, jujutsu and wrestling. Chakuriki later became a kickboxing gym as Harinck added Muay Thai and Savate to his repertoire. In 1978, fighters from Chakuriki became the first Dutch people to fight at Lumpini Stadium in Bangkok, Thailand.

During the late 1970s, despite their respective founders being both of the Jon Bluming lineage, Chakuriki became rivals of Mejiro Gym. While the Chakuriki fighters were known for their mental and physical toughness, Mejiro's had a reputation for their technical style. Kickboxing competitions were held regularly in the Jaap Edenhal Arena in Amsterdam and both Mejiro and Chakuriki fighters established themselves as the best in the country. This rivalry helped raise the standard of Dutch kickboxing and spawned some of the best fighters of the era. The 1980s and early 1990s saw a new generation of kickboxers rise from Chakuriki such as Peter Aerts and Branko Cikatić who helped form the history of K-1.

Chakuriki alumni Branko Cikatic founded "Chakuriki Tiger Gym" in his native Croatia, and also established a Japanese branch with Nobuki Hayashi as the director.

Thom Harinck and his son Tommy Harinck are the main coaches, while Wrestling and mixed martial arts are handled Chris Dolman, with Branko Cikatic visiting the Dutch headquarters from Croatia.

Harinck announced his retirement in April 2013 at the age of sixty-nine.

Notable fighters trained at Chakuriki

 Peter Aerts
 Xhavit Bajrami
 Gilbert Ballantine
 Branko Cikatić
 Lloyd van Dams
 Hesdy Gerges
 Badr Hari
 Lee Hasdell
 Nobu Hayashi
 Sergei Lascenko
 Jérôme Le Banner
 Melvin Manhoef
 Frank Muñoz
 Pedro Rizzo
 Rene Rooze
 Anderson "Braddock" Silva
 Perry Ubeda
 Amir Zeyada
 Saskia van Rijswijk

References

External

1972 establishments in the Netherlands
Kickboxing training facilities
Kickboxing in the Netherlands
Sports venues in Amsterdam
20th-century architecture in the Netherlands